Son Rompe Pera is a Mexican fusion band based in Naucalpan, a suburb of Mexico City. Primarily based on cumbia they integrate to their concept the use of Mexican marimba music traditional in the folkloric of their country and such other genres as danzón, rock, punk, ska and others.

History 
Son Rompe Pera is a group from colonia (neighborhood) Ramos Millán in Naucalpan, formed in 2017 by brothers Jesús Ángel "Kacho" Gama and Alan "Mongo" Gama. Marimba music is popular in the southern states of Mexico and in many cities there are marimba groups who play in the street or in places such as restaurants and squares. José Dolores "Batuco" Gama Melchor, their father, owned one marimba so the Gama brothers worked with the instrument playing alongside him in the streets and at parties.

When "Batuco" passed away they left that work, resuming it in 2017 to create the musical project Son Rompe Pera, a name which is an allusion to the energy of the rhythm they play and the name of Gama's brothers mother, Esperanza "Pera". "They asked for their mallets, and then laid down an amazing punky cumbia on the old instrument like I had never heard before. I was stunned", said “Timo” Bisig about the meeting.

In addition to Mexico, they have toured the United States. Their first album, Batuco, named in honor of their father, was well received by critics.

Members 

 Jesús Ángel "Kacho" Gama and Alan "Mongo" Gama - marimba, electric guitar
 "Murfy (Kilos)" - percussion
 Raúl Albarrán - drum kit
 Ricardo "Ritchie" López - bass guitar

Discography 

 2020: Batuco (AYA Records/ ZZK Records)

References 

Mexican alternative rock groups
Musical groups established in 2017
2017 establishments in Mexico
Musical groups from Naucalpan